Locust Grove Township is one of thirteen townships in Fremont County, Iowa, United States.  As of the 2010 census, its population was 164 and it contained 77 housing units.

Geography

Cemeteries
The township contains Locust Grove Cemetery and Saint Pauls Lutheran Cemetery.

Transportation
 Iowa Highway 333
 U.S. Route 59

School districts
 Farragut Community School District
 Hamburg Community School District

Political districts
 Iowa's 3rd congressional district
 State House District 23
 State Senate District 12

References

External links
 City-Data.com

Townships in Iowa
Townships in Fremont County, Iowa